Portage Township is one of the seventeen townships of Hancock County, Ohio, United States. As of the 2010 census, the population was 692, up from 604 at the 2000 census.

Geography
Located in the northern part of the county, it borders the following townships:
Henry Township, Wood County - north
Allen Township - east
Liberty Township - south
Blanchard Township - southwest corner
Pleasant Township - west
Jackson Township, Wood County - northwest corner

No municipalities are located in Portage Township.

Name and history
Statewide, other Portage Townships are located in Ottawa and Wood counties.

Portage Township was organized in 1833. The township was named for a river that runs through it.

Government
The township is governed by a three-member board of trustees, who are elected in November of odd-numbered years to a four-year term beginning on the following January 1. Two are elected in the year after the presidential election and one is elected in the year before it. There is also an elected township fiscal officer, who serves a four-year term beginning on April 1 of the year after the election, which is held in November of the year before the presidential election. Vacancies in the fiscal officership or on the board of trustees are filled by the remaining trustees.

References

External links

Townships in Hancock County, Ohio
Townships in Ohio